Kai Huckenbeck (born 23 February 1993) is a speedway rider from Germany.

Career
He rode in the top tier of British Speedway riding for the King's Lynn Stars in the SGB Premiership 2017. He has been the champion of Germany on three occasions.

In 2022, he broke his hip and arm riding for Brokstedt in the German Team Championship.

Major results

World individual Championship
2017 Speedway Grand Prix - 26th (4 pts)
2018 Speedway Grand Prix - 27th (2 pts)
2019 Speedway Grand Prix - 28th (0 pts)
2022 Speedway Grand Prix - 20th (7 pts)

References 

1993 births
Living people
German speedway riders
King's Lynn Stars riders